NGC 4200 is a lenticular galaxy located in the constellation Virgo.

References

External links 
 

Virgo (constellation)
4200
Lenticular galaxies